Dennis Lewis McKinnon (born August 22, 1961) is an American former professional football player who was a wide receiver in the National Football League (NFL) for the Chicago Bears and the Dallas Cowboys.

McKinnon played college football at Florida State University and was signed as an undrafted free agent by the Bears in 1983. He was the last undrafted free agent to score more than one touchdown for the Bears until Dane Sanzenbacher in 2011. He won Super Bowl XX as a member of the 1985 Chicago Bears.

In his eight seasons, McKinnon caught 194 passes for 3,012 yards and 22 touchdowns.  He also returned 129 punts for 1,191 yards and three touchdowns, and scored a rushing touchdown.  He caught 31 passes for 555 yards and seven touchdowns during the Bears' championship season in 1985.

McKinnon missed the entire 1986 season with a knee injury.

After spending the 1986 season on injured reserve, McKinnon returned in 1987 and scored on a 94-yard punt return in the season opener against the New York Giants. In Week 7 against the Tampa Bay Buccaneers, he scored again on a 65-yard punt return touchdown.

His best season was in 1988, when he caught 45 passes for 704 yards and three touchdowns, while also returning 40 punts for 405 yards and a franchise record two touchdowns (this record was later surpassed by Devin Hester in the 2006 season).  He went on to catch four passes for 108 yards and a touchdown in Chicago's 20-12 postseason win in a game known as the Fog Bowl.

At the time of his retirement, McKinnon's 1,191 punt return yards were the second-highest total in Chicago franchise history. , he held many playoff franchise records, including yards per reception and yards per game (17.3 and 43.1, min 20 receptions), receiving touchdowns (4 career; 2 in one season tied with Bernard Berrian), and most postseason games with a touchdown reception (3, tied with Willie Gault).

McKinnon released his autobiography, Chicago Bear #85 Silky D Bares All, in August 2019.

References

External links
databaseFootball.com

1961 births
Living people
American football wide receivers
American football return specialists
Florida State Seminoles football players
Chicago Bears players
Dallas Cowboys players
People from Quitman, Georgia